Haut-Lomami (French for "Upper Lomami") is one of the 21 new provinces of the Democratic Republic of the Congo created in the 2015 repartitioning.  Haut-Lomami, Haut-Katanga, Lualaba, and Tanganyika provinces are the result of the dismemberment of the former Katanga province.  Haut-Lomami was formed from the Haut-Lomami district whose town of Kamina was elevated to capital city of the new province.

Territories
 Bukama
 Kabongo
 Kamina
 Kaniama
 Malemba-Nkulu

See also 
 History of Katanga

References

 
Provinces of the Democratic Republic of the Congo